Gabrijel Palković, O.S.B.M. (15 April 1715 – 25 February 1759) was a Ruthenian and Croatian Greek Catholic hierarch. He was the titular bishop Drizipara and Vicar Apostolic of Marča from 1752 to 1759.

Biography
Born in Zakarpattia, Habsburg monarchy  (present day – Ukraine) in 1715, Palković was ordained a priest on 12 November 1741 as member of the Order of Saint Basil the Great. Before his nomination as bishop, Fr. Palković was the member of the Saint Nicholas Basilian Monastery in Mukacheve.

He was confirmed as the Bishop by the Holy See on 4 August 1752. He was consecrated to the Episcopate on September 1752. The principal consecrator was Bishop Manuil Olshavskyi.

He died in Karlovac on 25 February 1759.

References 

1715 births
1759 deaths
18th-century Eastern Catholic bishops
Croatian Eastern Catholics
Greek Catholic Church of Croatia and Serbia
Order of Saint Basil the Great